Three Royal Navy ships have been called HMS Egeria:

 The first  was an 18-gun (later 26-gun)  launched at Bridport in 1807 and broken up in 1864. 
 The second  was a 4-gun  screw composite sloop launched at Pembroke in 1873 and sold in 1911. 
 The third  was an  survey ship, built by William Weatherhead & Sons, Cockenzie, commissioned 1959 and sold in 1985.

Royal Navy ship names